The Shirley–Eustis House is a historic house located at 33 Shirley Street, Boston, Massachusetts. It is a U.S. National Historic Landmark.

The house is attributed to architect Peter Harrison, and built in part by Thomas Dawes, it is one of four remaining mansions of Royal Governors in the United States.

In 1763 Shirley's son-in-law Eliakim Hutchinson, Chief Justice of the Court of Common Pleas for Suffolk County, and one of Boston's richest men, acquired the house from his father-in-law. Upon retirement from his post as Governor of the Bahamas in 1769, William Shirley moved in with his daughter and son-in-law and lived there until his death in 1771.

After Hutchinson died in 1775, the house was occupied by Colonel Asa Whitcomb's Massachusetts Sixth Foot Regiment, and in 1778 it was seized as Loyalist property. It then sat unoccupied until purchased in 1782, then passed through a succession of owners, including the widow of a French planter in Haiti, a real estate speculator, and the China merchant James Magee, until it was acquired by Congressman William Eustis, Secretary of War under President James Madison during the War of 1812, Ambassador to the Netherlands 1815–1818, and the first Democratic-Republican Governor of Massachusetts from 1823 to 1825.

After Eustis' wife's death in 1865, the estate passed to relatives who auctioned off the house's contents. In 1867 its site was subdivided in 53 lots and sold. By 1886 the house was occupied by more than a dozen tenants; it was abandoned in 1911.

In 1913 William Sumner Appleton, who had recently founded the Society for the Preservation of New England Antiquities, founded the Shirley–Eustis House Association to save the house, which was then used for storage of antiquities.

It was declared a National Historic Landmark in 1960.

In the 1980s, historical architect Robert G. Neiley and the Shirley Eustis House Association spearheaded the salvation of the crumbling structure. Extensive restoration, carried out by Neiley himself in collaboration with McGinley Hart & Associates, began in the 1980s, and in 1991 the house opened to the public. The restoration, which included restoring the grounds to include an orchard, period perennial beds, parterre gardens, and a large lawn, won a Boston Preservation Alliance award for the best-restored small-scale structure in the City of Boston.

See also
 List of National Historic Landmarks in Boston
 National Register of Historic Places listings in southern Boston, Massachusetts

References

External links
 
 Roxbury Cultural Network
 

Houses in Boston
National Historic Landmarks in Massachusetts
Historic American Buildings Survey in Massachusetts
Houses completed in 1751
Historic house museums in Massachusetts
Museums in Boston
Museums established in 1991
National Register of Historic Places in Boston
Roxbury, Boston
1991 establishments in Massachusetts
Houses on the National Register of Historic Places in Suffolk County, Massachusetts
Eustis family